Richard Lydekker (25 July 1849 – 16 April 1915) was an English naturalist, geologist and writer of numerous books on natural history.

Biography
Richard Lydekker was born at Tavistock Square in London. His father was Gerard Wolfe Lydekker, a barrister-at-law with Dutch ancestry. The family moved to Harpenden Lodge soon after Richard's birth. He was educated at Trinity College, Cambridge, where he took a first-class in the Natural Science tripos (1872). In 1874 he joined the Geological Survey of India and made studies of the vertebrate palaeontology of northern India (especially Kashmir). He remained in this post until the death of his father in 1881. His main work in India was on the Siwalik palaeofauna; it was published in Palaeontologia Indica. He was responsible for the cataloguing of the fossil mammals, reptiles, and birds in the Natural History Museum (10 vols., 1891).

He named a variety of taxa including the golden-bellied mangabey; as a taxon authority he is named simply as "Lydekker".

Biogeography

He was influential in the science of biogeography. In 1895 he delineated the biogeographical boundary through Indonesia, known as Lydekker's Line, that separates Wallacea on the west from Australia-New Guinea on the east. It follows the edge of the Sahul Shelf, an area from New Guinea to Australia of shallow water with the Aru Islands on its edge. Along with Wallace's Line and Huxley's Line it indicates the definite effect of geology on the biogeography of the region, something not seen so clearly in other parts of the world.

First cuckoo
Lydekker attracted amused public attention with a pair of letters to The Times in 1913, when he wrote on 6 February that he had heard a cuckoo, contrary to Yarrell's History of British Birds which doubted the bird arrived before April. Six days later on 12 February 1913, he wrote again, confessing that "the note was uttered by a bricklayer's labourer". Letters about the first cuckoo became a tradition in the newspaper.

Awards
He received the Lyell Medal from the Geological Society of London in 1902.

Works
 Catalogue of the Fossil Mammalia in the British Museum (Natural History), 5 vols. (1885–1887)
Catalogue of the Fossil Reptilia and Amphibia in the British Museum (Natural History), 4 vols. (1889)
 A Manual of Palaeontology (with Henry Alleyne Nicholson, 2 vols., 1889)
 Catalogue of the Fossil Birds in the British Museum (Natural History) (1891)
 Phases of Animal Life (1892)
 The Royal Natural History (with W. H. Flower), 6 vols., 12 sec. (1893–1896)
 A Hand-book to the Marsupialia and Monotremata (1894)
 Life and Rock: A Collection of Zooogical and Geological Essays (1894)
 A Geographical History of Mammals (1896)
 A Hand-book to the British Mammalia (1896)
 A Handbook to the Carnivora : part 1 : cats, civets, and mongooses (1896)
 The Deer of all Lands : A history of the family Cervidae, living and extinct (1898)
 Wild Oxen, Sheep & Goats of all Lands, Living and Extinct (1898)
 The Wild Animals of India, Burma, Malaya, and Tibet (1900)
 The great and small game of Europe, western & northern Asia and America (1901)
 The New Natural History 6 vols. (1901)
 Living Races of Mankind: A popular illustrated account of the customs, habits, pursuits, feasts, and ceremonies of the races of mankind throughout the world, 2 vols. (1902), with Henry Neville Hutchinson and John Walter Gregory
 Mostly Mammals: Zoological Essays (1903)
 Guide to the Gallery of Reptilia and Amphibia in the British museum (1906)
 Sir William Flower (1906)
 The Game Animals of India, Burma, Malaya, and Tibet (rev. ed.) (1907)
 Guide to the Great Game Animals (Ungulata) in British Museum (1907)
 Guide to the Specimens of the Horse Family (Equidæ) in British Museum (1907)
 The Game Animals of Africa (1908)
 A Guide to the Domesticated Animals (other than horses) (1908)
 Guide to the Whales, Porpoises, and Dolphins (order Cetacea) (1909)
 A number of articles in the Encyclopædia Britannica, 1911
 Animal Portraiture (1912)
 The Horse and its Relatives (1912)
 The Sheep and its Cousins (1912)
 Catalogue of the heads and horns of Indian big game bequeathed by A. O. Hume ... to the British Museum (Natural History) (1913)
 Catalogue of the ungulate mammals in the British Museum (Natural History) 5 vols. (1913–1916)
 Wild life of the World : a descriptive survey of the geographical distribution of animals 3 vols. (1916)

See also
Australia (continent)
Wallace Line
Wallacea
Weber Line

Notes

External links 

 
 
 
 

1849 births
1915 deaths
Alumni of Trinity College, Cambridge
Biogeographers
Employees of the Natural History Museum, London
L
English geologists
English zoologists
Fellows of the Royal Society
Lyell Medal winners
Naturalists
Zoologists with author abbreviations